Vestalis gracilis, is a species of damselfly belonging to the family Calopterygidae. It is known commonly as the clear-winged forest glory or clear-winged flash-wing. It is native to Southeast Asia and surrounding regions.

Description
The male and female are similar in size; the male having an abdomen 45 to 46 millimeters long and a hindwing 34 to 38 millimeters long and the female with an abdomen 43 to 50 millimeters long and a hindwing 36 to 39 millimeters long.

The male is iridescent green with a yellow and black underside. It has brown legs and blue-tinged transparent wings. The eyes are dark brown above and greenish yellow below. The female is duller greenish brown in color.

Habitat
This is a common species across much of its range. It breeds in forest streams, often in disturbed and cultivated areas too. Commonly seen as a group rest among bushes in forest paths and shades together with Vestalis apicalis.

Subspecies
A subspecies, V. g.  Fraser, 1934, has been described from Western Ghats of South India. It is now synonymised with V. a. submontana and is considered as a separate species Vestalis submontana''.

See also
 List of odonates of India
 List of odonata of Kerala

References

External links

Calopterygidae
Taxa named by Jules Pierre Rambur
Insects described in 1842